The waterskiing competitions at the 2019 Southeast Asian Games in Philippines were held at Deca Wakeboard Park from 6 to 8 December 2019.

Medal table

Medalists

References

External links
  

2019 Southeast Asian Games events
Waterskiing at the Southeast Asian Games
2019 in water skiing